Administrative and Recruitment Affairs Organization (ARAO) is an agency of the Government of Iran. It was revived on 2 August 2016 on an order by Iran's President Hassan Rouhani.

The organization is currently headed by Jamshid Ansari.

References

Government of Iran
Government agencies of Iran